Gary Penn is a former British games reviewer who wrote for Zzap!64 in the 1980s and is a video game industry veteran. He later was editor of The One from 1988 to 1990 and was Creative Director at DMA Design where he supervised the release of the first Grand Theft Auto game in 1997.  Penn has described the game as taking years to develop and almost being cancelled.

Penn won the Games Media Legend award in 2007.

As of September 2011, he is head of development at Denki.
Penn claims his magazine background helped him setting up a "Hollywood-style" studio system there:

Penn is the author of the book Sensible Software 1986–1999.

References

External links
Gary Penn at MobyGames

British male journalists
British magazine editors
Living people
People from Hertfordshire
Year of birth missing (living people)
Video game critics